Jessica Parratto (born June 26, 1994) is an American diver.

Jessica Parratto is an eight-time USA Diving National Champion in women’s platform and platform synchro. At the age of 17 she competed at her first world event, the 2015 World Aquatics Championships. 
Parratto placed 10th in the Women's 10m Platform at the 2016 Summer Olympics in Rio. She competed at the 2020 Summer Olympics in the Women’s Synchronized Platform with partner Delaney Schnell, placing second and winning the first ever Olympic medal for the United States in that event.

Early life 
Daughter of Mike and Amy Parratto, Jessica and her sister Melissa grew up in Dover, New Hampshire. Her father Mike coached Olympic swimmer Jenny Thompson, one of the most decorated female Olympians of all time with 12 Olympic medals, 8 of which are gold. Her mother Amy was a five-time All American diver at Wellesley College and coached Jessica until the age of 14.

Diving career

2016 Summer Olympics 

Parratto’s Olympic debut was at the 2016 Summer Olympics in Rio de Janeiro. In the individual 10 meter platform event Parratto placed 10th with a score of 334.60 points. In the synchronized 10 meter platform dive event Parratto and her partner Amy Cozad took 7th place with a score of 301.02 points.

NCAA National Championships 

Parratto was the NCAA champion in 10m diving in 2015. She won with a score of 367.00 which was almost 30 points ahead of the runner up. She also competed in the 1m and 3m events. She placed 13th in the 1m event and tied for 7th in the 3m event.

2020 Summer Olympics 

Competed in the Synchronized Women's 10 meter event with Delaney Schnell, winning the silver medal. Parratto and Schnell won the first ever Olympic medal in the event for the United States.

Major competition results 
Summer Olympics
 2nd synchro 10m 2020 Summer Olympics
7th synchro 10m 2016 Summer Olympics 
 10th 10m 2016 Rio Summer Olympics
 World Championships
 9th synchro 10m 2015 FINA World Championships 
World Series
 7th synchro 10m 2014 FINA Diving World Series Beijing 
 6th synchro 10m 2014 FINA Diving World Series London
 9th 10m 2014 FINA Diving World Series
World Cup
 4th synchro 10m 2016 FINA Diving World Cup 
 8th synchro 10m 2010 FINA Canada Cup
Grand Prix
 2nd synchro 3m 2015 FINA Puerto Rico Grand Prix
 3rd synchro 10m 2015 FINA Grand Prix Australia
 4th synchro 10m 2015 FINA Puerto Rico Grand Prix
 9th 10m 2015 FINA Grand Prix Australia
 4th synchro 10m 2014 FINA Grand Prix Mexico
 4th 10m 2014 FINA Grand Prix Mexico
 4th synchro 10m 2012 International Springertag FINA Grand Prix
 4th synchro 10m 2011 AT&T USA Diving Grand Prix
 6th 10m 2011 AT&T USA Diving Grand Prix

See also
 United States at the 2015 World Aquatics Championships

References

External links
http://www.teamusa.org/usa-diving/athletes/Jessica-Parratto
Jessica Parratto - Women's Swimming and Diving
Parratto continues legacy of female IU diving champions
Jessica Parratto Pictures, Photos & Images - Zimbio
Photos: Dover's Jessica Parratto: Olympics in photos

American female divers
Living people
Place of birth missing (living people)
1994 births
Divers at the 2016 Summer Olympics
Olympic divers of the United States
Olympic silver medalists for the United States in diving
Olympic medalists in diving
Medalists at the 2020 Summer Olympics
Divers at the 2020 Summer Olympics
American people of Italian descent
21st-century American women